Texas Health Resources is one of the largest faith-based, nonprofit health systems in the United States and the largest in North Texas in terms of inpatients and outpatients served. The health system includes Texas Health Physicians Group and hospitals under the banners of Texas Health Presbyterian, Texas Health Arlington Memorial, Texas Health Harris Methodist and Texas Health Huguley. Texas Health has affiliated with numerous organizations — from all aspects of the health care industry — to better serve the more than 7 million residents of North Texas. These relationships, along with other major initiatives and quality programs, are supported by Texas Health's more than 350 points of access, 24,000 employees and 6,000 physicians with active staff privileges, with the collective aim to provide employers and consumers in North Texas with more affordable, high-quality and better-coordinated care. Their vision is "partnering with you for a lifetime of health and well-being."

Texas Health has 29 hospital locations - including acute-care, short-stay, behavioral health, rehabilitation and transitional care facilities - that are owned, operated or joint-ventured with Texas Health Resources along with more than 350 outpatient facilities, satellite emergency rooms, surgery centers, fitness centers, imaging centers and other community access points including Texas Health Physician Group clinics, doctors' offices, sleep medicine clinics, and Minute Clinics. In 2020, Fortune magazine ranked Texas Health Resources at number 15 on their Fortune List of the Top 100 Companies to Work For in 2020 based on an employee survey of satisfaction, rising to #7 in 2021.

History
Texas Health was formed in 1997 with the assets of Fort Worth-based Harris Methodist Health System and Dallas-based Presbyterian Healthcare Resources. Later that year, Arlington Memorial Hospital joined the Texas Health system.

In May 2016, Adeptus Health reached an agreement with Texas Health Resources in which it rebranded 27 First Choice Emergency Rooms, and all of the FCERs in Dallas–Fort Worth, under the Texas Health name.  However, the facilities were closed thereafter and the properties sold to other entities.

Service Area
Texas Health's points of access serve more than 7 million residents in 18 counties throughout the North Texas region: Collin, Cooke, Dallas, Denton, Ellis, Erath, Grayson, Hamilton, Henderson, Hood, Hunt, Johnson, Kaufman, Parker, Rockwall, Somervell, Tarrant, and Wise.

Texas Health Facilities

Hospitals
All hospitals managed by Texas Health Resources, whether solely or via joint venture, are branded as Texas Health followed by the location (unless otherwise specified below).

Alliance (located in far north Fort Worth)
Allen
Arlington (branded as Texas Health Arlington Memorial)
Azle
Clearfork (located in west Fort Worth)
Cleburne
Dallas (more commonly known as Texas Health Presbyterian Hospital Dallas, flagship hospital of Texas Health Resources)
Texas Health Presbyterian Hospital Denton
Flower Mound (Joint Venture)
Fort Worth
Frisco
HEB (located in Bedford)
Huguley (located in south Fort Worth with a Burleson address) (Joint Venture with AdventHealth)
Kaufman
Mansfield (Joint Venture with AdventHealth)
Plano
Rockwall (Joint Venture)
Southlake (Joint Venture)
Southwest Fort Worth
Stephenville
Texas Health Center for Diagnostics & Surgery Plano (Joint Venture)
Texas Health Heart & Vascular Hospital Arlington (Joint Venture)

Behavioral Health Centers
All behavioral health centers managed by Texas Health Resources, whether solely or via joint venture, are branded as Texas Health Behavioral Health Center followed by the location (unless otherwise specified below).

Alliance
Allen
Arlington (operates two centers near Texas Health Arlington Memorial, one as named above and the other named Behavioral Health only)
Dallas (operates two centers near Texas Health Dallas, one as named above and the other named Behavioral Health only)
Flower Mound
Fort Worth
Frisco
HEB (branded as Springwood Behavioral Health)
Huguley Fort Worth South (branded as a hospital)
Mansfield (branded as Recovery & Wellness Center)
Plano (branded as Seay Behavioral Health)
Prosper
Richardson
Rockwall
Southlake
Southwest Fort Worth
Uptown Dallas

Neighborhood Care & Wellness Centers
Each center provides a multitude of services, such as emergency care, advanced imaging, a fitness center and physician offices.
Texas Health Neighborhood Care & Wellness Burleson
Texas Health Neighborhood Care & Wellness Prosper
Texas Health Neighborhood Care & Wellness Willow Park

References

External links
Official Website
Becker's Hospital Review: 150 Top Places to Work in Healthcare 2017

Companies based in Arlington, Texas
Hospital networks in the United States